Marvel's Guardians of the Galaxy (titled Marvel's Guardians of the Galaxy: Mission Breakout for the final season) is an American animated television series  based on the Marvel Comics superhero team of the same name. It is produced by Marvel Animation. The series airs on Disney XD. It premiered on September 5, 2015, as part of the Marvel Universe on Disney XD.

While the series features the same main characters as the film of the same name, it is not a part of the Marvel Cinematic Universe nor is it set in the same continuity as the film. Seth Green was the only actor from the film to return, reprising his voice role as Howard the Duck.

The third and final season premiered in March 2018 and ended on June 9, 2019.

Plot

Season 1
The Guardians of the Galaxy team consists of Star-Lord, Gamora, Drax the Destroyer, Rocket Raccoon, and Groot. They have obtained an artifact called the Spartaxian CryptoCube that is tied to the Spartax race. Inside is a map leading to the Cosmic Seed. The Cosmic Seed is a powerful weapon that is capable of creating a new universe. The Guardians of the Galaxy must find and destroy the Cosmic Seed before it can wind up in the hands of Thanos, his minions Ronan the Accuser, Nebula, Korath the Pursuer, and his ally J'son (who is Star-Lord's long-lost father), the Ravagers led by Yondu, and anyone else who would abuse its power to threaten the entire universe.

Season 2
Marvel Entertainment announced on their Twitter feed that the Avengers will team up with the Guardians of the Galaxy in Season 2 for an episode where they fight the High Evolutionary.

Following Thanos's defeat, the Guardians of the Galaxy get their hands on a strange sarcophagus that was found on Thanos's asteroid base that has strange abilities and later stolen by Yondu. The Guardians of the Galaxy work to find the sarcophagus while competing against Mantis and the Universal Believers. This sarcophagus later hatches into Adam Warlock where the Guardians of the Galaxy were able to get him to follow his own destiny on the right path.

After escaping from his prison and  stealing the Nova Centurion helmets with the unwitting help of Sam Alexander, J'son makes plans to use them and gain control of Adam Warlock which leads to an event that turns Adam Warlock into the Magus after he absorbs J'son into his crystal where he attacks the planets associated with each of the Guardians of the Galaxy members. The Guardians of the Galaxy managed to break J'son out of Magus restoring him back to Adam Warlock. After J'son goes supernova with the Nova Centurian helmet that he steals from Peter, Adam Warlock takes the brunt of it and is cocooned by Groot until the day for his re-emergence occurs.

Season 3: Mission Breakout
A third season was announced at the D23 Expo, which is based on the Disney Parks attraction of the same name. In the final season, the Guardians of the Galaxy go on the run when they are framed by Collector who has Howard the Duck set them up for the theft of a Kree item after they broke some items in their last encounter at his special prison which leads to them evading the Kree Accuser Phyla-Vell. After Howard the Duck admitted being threatened by Collector into double-crossing the Guardians of the Galaxy as well as Collector's ship shrinking Hala by converting the black hole generator into a molecular compression engine, Phyla-Vell works with the Guardians of the Galaxy to save Hala and defeat Collector who gets away after setting his ship to self-destruct.

After traversing through the Black Vortex, the Guardians of the Galaxy discover that the Asgardians' old enemies the Darkhawks have been replacing Nova Prime and members of the Galactic Council. The Darkhawks are made by Odin's brother Serpent who plans to reclaim Asgard. Using the reforged sword Dragonfang after claiming its pieces from two different area's and Hela's domain of Niffleheim, the Guardians of the Galaxy with the aid of Thanos and Loki were able to defeat Serpent and save the galaxy.

This season included Marvel characters Spider-Man, Max Modell, Venom, and Carnage in a crossover with the television series Spider-Man, with Stan Lee having a voice role to go with his cameo.

Episodes

Cast

Main
 Will Friedle – Peter Quill/Star-Lord
 Trevor Devall – Rocket Raccoon, Ranger Raccoon, Black Bolt, Fandral 
 Vanessa Marshall – Gamora, Meredith Quill (Season 1), Crystal  
 Kevin Michael Richardson - Groot, Wal Rus, Mandala, Supreme Intelligence, Heimdall, Blood Brothers, Black Vortex (Physical Form) 
 David Sobolov – Drax the Destroyer, Blackjack O'Hare

Additional voices

 Jonathan Adams – Ronan the Accuser 
 Charlie Adler - MODOK 
 Pamela Adlon – Ma Raccoon, Sis Raccoon
 Diedrich Bader – Maximus Boltagon
 Laura Bailey – Forest Animals, Posh Woman
 Troy Baker – Loki, Hermod, Hawkeye 
 Eric Bauza – Adam Warlock/Magus, Prince Shokk 
 Jeff Bennett – Rhomann Dey, Wraith, Principal Philbin  
 JB Blanc – Titus
 Jesse Burch – Black Dwarf, Bruce Banner (Season 2), Moragan 
 Robbie Daymond – Peter Parker/Spider-Man 
 Jessica DiCicco – Tana Nile 
 John DiMaggio – Lunatik
 Robin Atkin Downes – Serpent 
 Eric Edelstein – Sheriff Michael Coogan
 Dave Fennoy – Korath the Pursuer
 Jonathan Frakes – J'son 
 Nika Futterman – Angela 
 Morla Gorrondona – Xeron 
 Brian George – Pyko
 Grant George – Ant-Man (Season 2) 
 Seth Green – Howard the Duck 
 Grey Griffin – Captain Marvel 
 Jennifer Hale – Mantis
 Gavin Hammon – Alien Father 
 David Kaye – Corvus Glaive 
 Josh Keaton – Ant-Man (Season 3) 
 Tom Kenny – Collector 
 Stan Lee – Elevator Operator 
 Logan Miller – Sam Alexander/Nova 
 Melanie Minichino – Eva Alexander 
 Nolan North – Gorgon, High Evolutionary, Jesse Alexander 
 Toks Olagundoye – Ja Kyee Lrurt 
 Khary Payton – Jukka 
 Stephen Root – Neeza
 Marion Ross – Doctor Minerva 
 Della Saba – Kaelynn Alexander 
 Kevin Shinick – Bruce Banner (Season 3) 
 Isaac C. Singleton Jr. – Thanos
 Roger Craig Smith – Captain America, Diviek
 Jason Spisak – Grandmaster
 Tara Strong – Irani Rael/Nova Prime, Lucy, Rora, Young Adam Warlock 
 Cree Summer – Nebula, Meredith Quill (shorts), Captain Victoria 
 Raven-Symoné – Valkyrie 
 Catherine Taber – Medusa
 Fred Tatasciore – Hulk, Max Modell, Prince Trow-Mah, Gronk 
 James Arnold Taylor – Yondu Udonta, Cosmo the Spacedog, Svel Smard, J'Que, Kraglin, Darkhawk 
 James Urbaniak – Ebony Maw 
 Oliver Vaquer – Karnak
 Kari Wahlgren – Proxima Midnight, Hela
 Hynden Walch – Supergiant 
 Talon Warburton – Champion of the Universe 
 Audrey Wasilewski – Black Vortex (Dream Form) 
 Frank Welker – Odin 
 Ming-Na Wen – Phyla-Vell 
 Wil Wheaton – Michael Korvac 
 Travis Willingham – Thor, Hogun, General Glogug 
 Mick Wingert – Iron Man 
 Henry Winkler – Grandpa  
 Dave Wittenberg – Ichthyo Pike

Crew
 Leo Riley – Supervising Director
 Lisa Schaffer – Casting and Voice Director

Production
Marvel was rumored to be considering a new animated series with another Spider-Man show or a Guardians of the Galaxy show. The appearances of the Guardians of the Galaxy in Avengers Assemble and Ultimate Spider-Man were supposed to be test runs for their own show. Screenrant.com.com indicated in January 2014 that the Guardians of the Galaxy series was selected for development.

On July 26, 2014, at San Diego Comic-Con, a week before the release of the Guardians of the Galaxy film, Marvel Animation announced the Guardians of the Galaxy animated TV series with a trailer featuring Rocket Raccoon and Star-Lord. With the success of the live action film, Marvel and Disney XD announced that they were moving forward with the animated series at New York Comic Con. They showed some test footage to the audience. It is intended to air in 2015 as a part of the Marvel Universe on Disney XD.

Advanced previews of the show started airing on Disney XD on August 1, 2015. A full preview of the series aired on Disney XD on September 5, 2015. The official one-hour premiere aired on September 26, 2015.

Each episode is named after or a reference to a popular song from the 1960s, 1970s, or 1980s.

At New York Comic Con 2015, it was announced the series had been renewed for a second season, which Disney XD premiered on March 11, 2017.

Broadcast
Guardians of the Galaxy aired on Disney XD in the United States and Disney Channel in Canada on September 5, 2015, as a preview. It officially debuted on September 26, 2015. The series premiered on Disney XD in the United Kingdom and Ireland on November 7, 2015. It also premiered on Disney XD in Australia and New Zealand on November 8, 2015. In India, from March 8, 2019, it is being aired on Marvel HQ, an Indian version of Disney XD.

Reception

Ratings

Critical response
On Rotten Tomatoes season 1 has an approval rating of 86% based on reviews from 7 critics.

Nerdist gave the show a positive review stating "this was a pretty solid introduction to the Guardians of the Galaxy animated series". ToonZone said "the premiere was pretty good, but the episodes that followed have shown real promise". Screenrant wrote "Disney XD's Guardians of the Galaxy delivers an exhilarating action-packed adventure." The Nerd Repository praised the series and stated "Marvel's Guardians of the Galaxy is an absolute blast and probably the best thing Marvel Animation has done in a long while."

IGN gave the episodes a mixed review (6.6/10) and said "the show seems too concerned with adhering to the style, tone and look of the movie and not with leaving its own mark on the characters." The A.V. Club gave the premiere a "B−" ranking. They wrote that "Disney XD has a very specific demographic that they are aiming for, which leaves 'Road to Knowhere/Knowhere to Run' somewhat clunky and awkward." The Solute stated "There is certainly potential for interesting stories to be told within Marvel's cosmic realm, especially when told in the medium of animation, but Guardians Of The Galaxy is far from realizing that potential right now."

Music
In late August, it was revealed that licensed songs from the 1970s would be used to augment the tone and soundtrack of the series.

In September, Marvel's Guardians of the Galaxy: Cosmic Mix Vol. 1 (Music from the Animated Television Series) was announced. It is a collection of 12 songs featured in the show's first season.

Comics
The animated series is adapted into a comic book series known as Marvel Universe: Guardians of the Galaxy. It uses the episode's art work with writing and lettering by Joe Caramagna.

References

External links

 
 
 

2010s American animated television series
2015 American television series debuts
2019 American television series endings
American children's animated action television series
American children's animated space adventure television series
American children's animated science fantasy television series
American children's animated superhero television series
Animated television series based on Marvel Comics
Disney XD original programming
English-language television shows
Guardians of the Galaxy
Marvel Animation
Television shows based on Marvel Comics
Television series by Disney–ABC Domestic Television
Television series about alien visitations
Animated television series about extraterrestrial life
Television series set on fictional planets
Space Western television series